"One Better Day" is a song by English ska band Madness from their fifth studio album Keep Moving (1984). The song, written by Suggs (Graham McPherson) and Mark Bedford, was released as a single in the United Kingdom, and spent seven weeks in the charts peaking at number 18.

The single was a last minute choice, as "Victoria Gardens" from the same album was originally slated to be the album's second single. The remixed version of "Victoria Gardens" intended for the A-side was instead included as a bonus track on the 12" single. The substitution was likely made to avoid releasing two consecutive singles with Carl Smyth as lead vocalist, following the disappointing (by their standards) sales of "Michael Caine" and widespread rumours that Suggs was about to leave, or had already left, the group.  This was the last single on the Stiff Records label, before the band's creation of their own label, Zarjazz Records. The B-side "Guns" was McPherson's first solo writing credit and meant that all seven members of the group had at least one solo composition.

Theme
In an interview with Daniel Rachel, for the 2013 book Isle of Noise: Conversations with Great Songwriters, Suggs explained: "The idea of that song was when you'd hear people say, 'Oh, he's seen better days,' like when you see a guy in a suit looking a bit tatty. I thought, 'What was that one better day?' Then I had the idea that he would meet this other homeless person that happened to be a woman - and they fell in love. Between them they could engender one better day as people who had, supposedly, seen better days."

Music video
The single was the final release under Stiff Records and the label did not want to produce an accompanying music video so the band had to fund it themselves. Mike Barson flew from Amsterdam especially and a video was filmed in London's Arlington Road, just outside the  homeless refuge Arlington House, which is mentioned in the first line of the song.

Most of the video shows the band members as homeless people, except a few clips showing them performing the song. It also shows Suggs dancing with his wife Bette Bright, who plays a homeless woman in the video.

Appearances
In addition to its single release and appearance on the album Keep Moving, "One Better Day" also appears on the Madness collections Divine Madness (a.k.a. The Heavy Heavy Hits, 1992), Utter Madness (1986), Total Madness (1997), The Business (1993) and  Our House: The Original Songs (2002). It did not appear on any of the band's US compilations.

Formats and track listings
These are the formats and track listings of major single releases of "One Better Day".

 7" Single
"One Better Day" (McPherson, Bedford) – 4:06
"Guns" (McPherson) – 3:14

 12" Single
"One Better Day" (McPherson, Bedford) – 4:06
"Guns" (McPherson) – 3:14
"Victoria Gardens" (Smyth, Barson, Smyth) – 4:01
"Sarah" (Thompson, Madness) – 3:43

Charts

References

External links
 

1984 singles
Madness (band) songs
Songs written by Suggs (singer)
Songs written by Mark Bedford
1984 songs
Stiff Records singles
Songs about homelessness
Song recordings produced by Clive Langer
Song recordings produced by Alan Winstanley